The following lists events that happened during 1949 in Jordan.

Incumbents
Monarch: Abdullah I 
Prime Minister: Tawfik Abu al-Huda

Events

June
 June 2 - Transjordan becomes the Kingdom of Jordan.

September
 September 13 - The Soviet Union vetoes United Nations membership for Ceylon, Finland, Iceland, Italy, Jordan and Portugal.

See also
 Years in Iraq
 Years in Syria
 Years in Saudi Arabia

References

 
1940s in Jordan
Jordan
Jordan
Years of the 20th century in Jordan